Hamiota is a genus of freshwater mussels, aquatic bivalve mollusks in the family Unionidae, the river mussels.

Species within the genus Hamiota
 Hamiota altilis (Finelined pocketbook)
 Hamiota australis (Southern sandshell)
 Hamiota perovalis (Orangenacre mucket)
 Hamiota subangulata (Shinyrayed pocketbook)

Unionidae
Bivalve genera